Richard Gibson (by 1480–1534), of London and New Romney, Kent, was an English politician.

He was a Member of Parliament (MP) for New Romney in 1529. He was also jurat of New Romney, commissioner for sewers of Kent, city bailiff of Southwark, and warden and master of the Worshipful Company of Merchant Taylors.

References

15th-century births
1534 deaths
Bailiffs
Commissioners for sewers
Jurats
Worshipful Company of Merchant Taylors
Members of Parliament for New Romney
Politicians from London
English MPs 1529–1536